The Battle of Marsaglia was a battle in the Nine Years' War, fought in Italy on 4 October 1693, between the French army of Marshal Nicolas Catinat and the army of the Grand Alliance under Duke Victor Amadeus II of Savoy.

Catinat, advancing from Fenestrelle and Susa to the relief Pinerolo, defended by the count of Tessé and which the duke of Savoy was besieging, took up a position in formal order of battle north of the village of Marsaglia, near Orbassano. Here, on 4 October, the duke of Savoy attacked him with his whole army, front to front, but the greatly superior regimental efficiency of the French, and Catinat's minute attention to detail in arraying them, gave the new marshal a victory that was a worthy pendant to Neerwinden.

The Piedmontese and their allies lost c. 12,000 killed, wounded and prisoners, as against Catinat's 1,800.

Marsaglia is, if not the first, at any rate, one of the first, instances of a bayonet charge by a long deployed line of infantry. Hussars figured here for the first time in western Europe. A regiment of them had been raised in 1692 from deserters from the Austrian service. It is also notable as one of the first major battles to see the new Irish Brigade in action for the French army.

Notes

References 

1693 in France
Battles of the Nine Years' War
Battles involving France
Battles involving Spain
Conflicts in 1693
Battles in Piedmont
Orbassano